The 1982 NFL draft was the procedure by which National Football League teams selected amateur college football players. It is officially known as the NFL Annual Player Selection Meeting. The draft was held April 27–28, 1982, at the New York Sheraton Hotel in New York City, New York. At the time of the draft the Raiders were still the Oakland Raiders, they relocated to Los Angeles in May 1982. The league also held a supplemental draft after the regular draft and before the regular season.

With the first overall pick of the draft, the New England Patriots selected defensive end Kenneth Sims.

Player selections

Round one
NOTE: The New Orleans Saints forfeited the No. 3  overall pick to select Illinois quarterback Dave Wilson in the 1981 supplemental draft.

Round two

Round three

Round four

Round five

Round six

Round seven

Round eight

Round nine

Round ten

Round eleven

Round twelve

Hall of Famers
 Mike Munchak, guard from Pennsylvania State, taken 1st round 8th overall by Houston Oilers
Inducted: Professional Football Hall of Fame class of 2001.
 Marcus Allen, running back from Southern California, taken 1st round 10th overall by Los Angeles Raiders
Inducted: Professional Football Hall of Fame class of 2003.
 Andre Tippett, linebacker from Iowa, taken 2nd round 41st overall by New England Patriots
Inducted: Professional Football Hall of Fame class of 2008.
 Morten Andersen, kicker from Michigan State, taken 4th round 86th overall by New Orleans Saints
Inducted: Professional Football Hall of Fame class of 2017.

Notable undrafted players

References

External links
 NFL.com – 1982 Draft
 databaseFootball.com – 1982 Draft
 Pro Football Hall of Fame

National Football League Draft
NFL Draft
Draft
NFL Draft
NFL Draft
American football in New York City
1980s in Manhattan
Sporting events in New York City
Sports in Manhattan